Scalanago lateralis, or the ladder eel is a species of eel in the family Congridae. It is the only member of its genus. It is only found around Australia.

References

Congridae
Fish described in 1935